The Accident (French: L'accident) is a 1963 French crime drama film directed by Edmond T. Gréville and starring Georges Rivière, Magali Noël and .

The film's sets were designed by the art director Sydney Bettex.

Cast
Georges Rivière as Julien
Magali Noël as Andréa
 as Françoise Cassel
Roland Lesaffre as The Goualec
Jean Combal as police inspector

References

External links

French crime drama films
1963 crime drama films
Films directed by Edmond T. Gréville
1960s French-language films
1960s French films

fr:L'Accident (film, 1963)